Giasuddin Islamic Model College is a college in Narayanganj, Bangladesh, founded in 2010.

The college is located approximately 450 feet south of Muktiswarani Gate on the Dhaka-Chittagong Highway, approximately 800 feet west of Demra-Narayanganj Road, on the north side of Road No. 02 in Hirajhil area of Narayanganj District, Siddhirganj Police Station.

History
Giasuddin Islamic Model College was established January 14, 2010, by Muhammad Giasuddin (former MP). The college officially opened July 1, 2010.

Academics
The college offers primary and secondary education for boys and girls even though it is non-co-educational. Generally, boys and girls are split into same time in separate classes.

See also
List of colleges in Bangladesh
List of universities in Bangladesh
Education in Bangladesh

References

External links
 
 

Education in Narayanganj